Simpson is an unincorporated community in Lyon County, in the U.S. state of Nevada.

History
A post office was established at Simpson in 1913, and remained in operation until 1943. The community was named after the local Simpson family.

References

Unincorporated communities in Lyon County, Nevada